Angry Birds Star Wars II is a discontinued puzzle video game, a crossover between Star Wars and the Angry Birds series, that was released on September 18, 2013. The game is the seventh Angry Birds game and the second where players can play as pigs (the first is the original game in King Pig Mode), developed by Rovio Entertainment. The game is a prequel to Angry Birds Star Wars and is based on the Star Wars prequel trilogy, as well as the television show Star Wars Rebels. Angry Birds Star Wars II was discontinued on February 3, 2020, along with Angry Birds Star Wars and Angry Birds Rio, with the games also being pulled out of the app stores.

Gameplay
In Angry Birds Star Wars II, players must destroy targets fortified in or out of their created fortresses including various bosses, depending on the side they are in (Bird or Pork side). Players also earn up to 3 stars, as of other games in the series. The game features over 56 playable characters. The game differs from the other Angry Birds games because the player can summon a specific bird/pig instead of the pre-determined selection. This summoning can be done to replace each bird/pig.

Telepods
The game is compatible with Hasbro Telepod technology, which is similar in concept to the "Portal of Power" from the Skylanders video game series, allowing the player to summon a specific character into the game via its QR code; this summon is once per level, but the player can use multiple Telepod summons per level. Each Telepod can be used on up to 15 separate devices and one must rescan the Telepod to get access to the particular bird/pig if the game is fully closed.

As of December 2013, Hasbro has sold over 1 million Angry Birds Star Wars II Telepods, including Darth Vader, Yoda, General Grievous, C-3PO, the Inquisitor, and more.

Shop
The player can via in-app purchase or through achievement rewards, have the use of certain birds or pigs during gameplay. With the Rise of the Clones following up with the Revenge of the Pork and the TV show Rebels update, the former Watto's shop, which was a separate area of the game to buy usable birds/pigs, was removed and was merged within the character swap menu.

Characters
In Angry Birds Star Wars II, birds and pigs play the roles of characters from the Star Wars prequel trilogy. Characters from the original trilogy and the television show Star Wars Rebels also make appearances in bird/pig form. In official books and annuals, characters' names are changed to fit whether they are portrayed by bird or pig. (e.g. Boba Fett becomes Boba Fatt).

Release
The game was released on September 18, 2013. PC and Mac OS X versions of the game were announced and the Windows PC version was released on October 24. The Mac version's release plan was discontinued, and on November 13, 2014, the Windows PC version was no longer available for purchase or download and will not be updated.

Discontinuation

The game was discontinued on February 3, 2020, alongside every Angry Birds title released before Angry Birds Transformers (except for Angry Birds Friends). It was removed from both App Store and Google Play.

Reception

The game has received generally favorable reviews with a Metacritic score of 77/100 based on 24 reviews. While the game continues the gameplay of its predecessor with fun new ideas, some reviewers have noted that the increase in the number of playable characters may make the levels unbalanced due to characters having different powers. Some reviewers did not like the numerous microtransactions but found the game fun.

At the 2014 Kids' Choice Awards, Angry Birds Star Wars II received a nomination for Favorite App Game.

References

External links

 

2013 video games
Android (operating system) games
Star Wars II
Crossover video games
Delisted digital-only games
LucasArts games
IOS games
Products and services discontinued in 2020
Puzzle video games
Star Wars video games
Video games developed in Finland
Video game prequels
Video game sequels
Windows games
Windows Phone games
Rovio Entertainment games
Single-player video games